Bethel Church is a historic church building in rural Morning Sun, Iowa, United States. The congregation was organized by the Wapello mission of the Methodist Episcopal Church in Iowa in 1854. In addition to the Morning Sun congregation, the Wapello mission included congregations in Concord, Long Creek, and two in Wapello. The property for the church building and its adjacent cemetery was donated by Merit Jamison. Members of the congregation built the building under the supervision of stonemason Francis McGraw. The limestone structure is a Vernacular form of Iowa folk architecture. The small cornice returns are influenced by the Greek Revival style. The plain interior features plastered walls, plank flooring and wood-carved furnishings from the church's early years. The iron fence that runs along the gravel road was added in 1861. The church is no used for regularly scheduled services. It was added to the National Register of Historic Places in 1979.

References

Religious organizations established in 1854
Churches completed in 1855
Methodist churches in Iowa
Vernacular architecture in Iowa
National Register of Historic Places in Louisa County, Iowa
Churches on the National Register of Historic Places in Iowa
Louisa County, Iowa
1854 establishments in Iowa